Josep Carcoler (1698–1776) was a Catalan composer. Some of his works are preserved in Latin American manuscripts.

Works, editions, recordings
 Stabat Mater. With works by Francisco Valls, Tomàs Milans Zarzuela al Santísimo, Antonio Literes, Joan Rossell. Mapa Harmónico dir. Francesc Bonastre. Columna Musica 2005.

References

Spanish male composers
1698 births
1776 deaths
Composers from Catalonia